Ayn may refer to:

 Ayn, Savoie, a commune of the Savoie département of France
 Ghayn (Cyrillic) (Ғ,ғ), a letter used in the Bashkir, Kazakh, and Tajik alphabets
 Ayn Rand, Russian-born American novelist and philosopher
 Anyang Airport, China, IATA code AYN
 San'ani Arabic (ISO 639-3 ayn), an Arabic dialect spoken in Yemen
 Al Ain, a city in the Emirate of Abu Dhabi in the United Arab Emirates
 Cayn, or Ayn, a disputed region of Somaliland

See also 
 Ain (disambiguation)
 Al Ayn (disambiguation)